Brighter Days is the debut studio album by British DJ and record producer Sigala. It was released through Ministry of Sound and Columbia Records on 28 September 2018. It includes his six UK top 10 singles, including the number-one hit "Easy Love".

Singles
"Easy Love" was released as the album's lead single on 4 September 2015. The song reached number one in the United Kingdom and three in Ireland. "Sweet Lovin'" was released as the album's second single on 4 December 2015. It features Bryn Christopher. The song reached number three in the United Kingdom and number six in Ireland. "Say You Do" was released as the album's third single on 18 March 2016. It features Imani and DJ Fresh. The song reached number five in the United Kingdom and number 27 in Ireland. "Give Me Your Love" was released as the album's fourth single on 29 April 2016. It features John Newman and Nile Rodgers. The song reached number nine in the United Kingdom and number 46 in Ireland. "Ain't Giving Up" was released as the album's fifth single on 19 August 2016. It is a collaboration with Craig David. The song reached number 23 in the United Kingdom and number 61 in Ireland.

"Came Here for Love" was released as the album's sixth single on 9 June 2017. It is a collaboration with Ella Eyre. The song reached number six in the United Kingdom and number nine in Ireland. "Lullaby" was released as the album's seventh single on 23 February 2018. It is a collaboration with Paloma Faith. The song reached number six in the United Kingdom and number eight in Ireland. "Feels Like Home" was released as the album's eighth single on 14 June 2018. It features Sean Paul, Fuse ODG and Kent Jones. The song reached number 71 in the United Kingdom and number 52 in Ireland. "We Don't Care" was released as the album's ninth single on 27 July 2018. It is a collaboration with The Vamps. The song reached number 59 in Ireland. "Just Got Paid" was released as the album's tenth and final single on 7 September 2018. It is a collaboration with Ella Eyre and Meghan Trainor and features French Montana. The single reached number 11 on the UK chart.

Track listing

Charts

Weekly charts

Year-end charts

Certifications

References

2018 debut albums
Sigala albums
Albums produced by Sigala
Columbia Records albums
Ministry of Sound albums
Albums produced by Steve Manovski